Frank "Rudy" Henderson (April 7, 1928 – December 28, 2012) was an American politician from Miller, South Dakota.

Career
Henderson served in the South Dakota Senate twice in 1965-1966 and again in 1969-1970. Henderson had a law practice in Rapid City and then Hill City.

Judicial service
In 1974, he was elected as a circuit judge for the Seventh Judicial Circuit Court for South Dakota. In 1979 he was elected as an associate justice of the South Dakota Supreme Court, defeating incumbent Lawrence Zastrow and served until 1994.

Military service
Henderson was a veteran who fought in the Korean War from 1951-1953. He earned the United Nations Medal, the Korean Service Medal and a Bronze Star for his service. He also suffered for several decades from post-traumatic stress disorder.

References

1928 births
2012 deaths
People from Miller, South Dakota
South Dakota state senators
Justices of the South Dakota Supreme Court
People from Rapid City, South Dakota
People from Hill City, South Dakota
20th-century American judges